Solitary rectal ulcer syndrome or SRUS is a chronic, benign disorder of the rectal mucosa (the lining of the rectum). It commonly occurs with varying degrees of rectal prolapse. The condition is thought to be caused by different factors, such as long term constipation, straining during defecation, and dyssynergic defecation. Treatment is by normalization of bowel habits, biofeedback, and other conservative measures. In more severe cases various surgical procedures may be indicated. The condition is relatively rare, affecting approximately 1 in 100,000 people per year. It affects mainly adults aged 30–50. Females are affected slightly more often than males. The disorder can be confused clinically with rectal cancer or other conditions such as inflammatory bowel disease, even when a biopsy is done.

Signs and symptoms
The signs and symptoms are variable, and in up to 25% of patients there may be no symptoms. The most common symptoms and signs are bleeding, which can vary from minor to severe, rectal prolapse and incomplete evacuation (35%-76% of cases). According to one report, constipation is present in about 55% of cases, but diarrhea is present in 20%–40% of cases. Reported symptoms are:

 Hematochezia (lower gastrointestinal bleeding). which can vary from minor to severe.
 Rectal pain.
 Pelvic discomfort.
 Tenesmus.
 Sensation of incomplete evacuation of stool.
 Mucous rectal discharge.
 Constipation, which may be chronic and severe.
 Straining during defecation.
 Rectal prolapse or other pelvic floor disorders.
 Repeated use of laxatives.
 Fecal incontinence.

Causes
The exact cause is unclear and the condition is not fully understood. There are thought to be multiple factors which simultaneously cause the condition. Long term injury to the rectal mucosa and ischemic trauma are thought to be the main mechanisms. In a report of 36 patients with SRUS, the underlying cause was internal prolapse (intussusception) in 20 patients, external rectal prolapse in 14 patients, and dyssynergic defecation (anismus) in 2 patients.

Direct trauma
Self-digitation is when patients experiencing constipation resort to inserting a finger into the rectum in order to "hook out" fecal pellets, or to apply pressure to an obstructing lesion (see: obstructed defecation). The rectal mucosa is fragile and vulnerable to trauma when such manoeuvres are performed chronically. It is thought that this self-induced trauma is one possible mechanism of SRUS. However, since sometimes the location of SRUS lesion(s) is much further than a finger could reach means that this cannot be the only cause. In constipation, the stools may be very hard and this is another possible mechanism of trauma.

Excessive straining: chronic constipation, dyssynergic defecation
People with constipation or certain anatomical anomalies are more likely to end up using excessive straining during defecation attempts. Prolonged straining may cause direct trauma to the rectal mucosa. Most patients with SRUS have dyssynergic defecation (previously termed anismus). This is a failure of relaxation (or paradoxical contraction) of the puborectalis muscle during defecation attempts. This pelvic floor muscle is normally supposed to relax, thereby straightening the anorectal angle and allowing rectal contents to be evacuated. Dyssynergic defecation causes high pressure in the rectum and in the anal canal, which causes lengthening and compression of the rectal tissues, which in turn leads to ischema of the mucosa. There is also a shearing movement of the rectum against the pelvic floor muscles. In the long term this leads to repeated mucosal damage. Inappropriate contraction of puborectalis in the squatting position causes traumatic compression of the rectal wall against the anal canal. Also, it is reported that individuals with SRUS have not only increased pressure when squeezing, but also higher resting pressure compared to normal controls.

Rectal prolapse and ischemic injury
SRUS is usually accompanied by prolapse (e.g. external prolapse or rectoanal intussusception/internal prolapse) or other pelvic-floor disorders. This is association is common, but not always present. Some state that if SRUS is not treated, it would always tend to progress to rectal prolapse. The relationship of SRUS with rectal prolapse and rectal cystitis profunda is debated. Some see SRUS and prolapse as synonymous, while others see them as separate entities, and state that they do not share the same physiology. For example the mucosal changes that occur with external rectal prolapse can be separated from the mucosal changes seen in SRUS.

The excessive pressure caused by straining (dyssynergic defecation and constipation) may in the long term lead to development of the spectrum of rectal prolapse conditions (mucosal versus full-thickness prolapse, internal versus external rectal prolapse). These conditions create chronic vascular trauma (ischemia/hypoperfusion) in the rectal mucosa, which predisposes it to ulceration, and pressure necrosis. Even the initial small areas of an intussusception can lead to vascular injury and reduce blood supply to the region. This is the first stage of ulcer development.

Other factors
Psychological factors are also thought to be involved, since patients with SRUS sometimes psychological disorders such as obsessive-compulsive disorder. Also, some unknown factors may also be involved such as hormonal factors related to pregnancy. Other possible factors are rectal hypersensitivity, and impaired rectal evacuation of stool.

Diagnosis
Diagnosis is difficult because of rarity of the condition and variability of the symptoms and the histologic appearance. The condition is sometimes misdiagnosed. Diagnosis may be delayed by many years as a result.

Differential diagnosis
The differential diagnosis is as follows:
 Inflammatory bowel disease (IBD).
 rectal neoplasms (bowel cancer).
 Chronic vascular insufficiency (Ischaemic colitis).
 Infectious diseases (e.g. amebiasis, lymphogranuloma venereum, syphilis).
 Rectal endometriosis.
 Drugs.
 Colitis cystica profunda.
 Drug induced ulcer.
 Pressure ulcer.
 Trauma.
 Idiopathic (i.e. unknown cause).

Investigations
Investigations used in the diagnosis of SRUS include defecography, endoanal ultrasound colonoscopy and histological examination of a biopsy.

Colonoscopy
The macroscopic appearance of SRUS is very variable. Indeed, the condition has been referred to as “the three-lies disease”, because the name of the condition is sometimes misleading. In reality, there may be more than one lesion, which may not be ulcerative, and the condition may appear in different parts of the gastrointestinal tract (i.e. other than the rectum).

Classically, there is a solitary ulcer. But only 20% of patients have a single ulcer whereas in other cases there may be multiple lesions. The size of the ulcers is usually 0.5–4 cm. The lesion is most often located on the anterior (front) or lateral (side) rectal wall, centered on a rectal fold, usually 10 cm from the anal verge. Less commonly there may be ulcers in the anal canal or even in the sigmoid colon. The nature of the tissue changes can vary from simple erythema (redness) / hyperaemia (increased blood flow) of the mucosa 18% of cases, to a chronic-appearing, small shallow ulcer with nodular margins and a white or sloughing base. In up to 33% of cases there is no ulceration but instead one or more well-developed polyps or mass lesions. There is usually mild proctitis (inflammation of the rectal mucosa) surrounding the ulcer.

Defecography
Conventional defecography or magnetic resonance defecography may be used. Between 50-100% of patients with SRUS will have abnormal defecography results. Defecography findings in SRUS may include:
 Evidence of dyssynergic defecation (anismus), 82% of patients with SRUS had dssynergic defecation in one report.
 Rectal intussusception (the most common finding in one report).
 Anterior (front) or posterior (back) rectocele.
 Prolonged retention of contrast media.
 Megarectum.

Endoanal ultrasound
Endoanal ultrasound can determine the depth of the ulcer and structure of the external and internal anal sphincters. Endoanal ultrasound findings in SRUS include: 
 Lack of distinction between the mucusa and the muscularis propria.
 Thickening of the rectal wall.
 Thickening muscularis propria. 
 Thickening of internal anal sphincter.
 Thickening of external anal sphincter.
 Thickening of submucosal layer.
 Intussusception.
 Multiple submucosal cysts.
 Hyperechogenic bands of fibrosis in the submucosa layer.
 Regional lymph node infiltration.

Biopsy
The histological appearance is as follows:
 Segmental and superficial (shallow) ulceration.
 Obliteration of the lamina propria with fibromuscular / collagen infiltration. This feature differentiates SRUS from inflammatory bowel disease, and is the landmark diagnostic feature for SRUS.
 Hypertrophy and disruption of muscularis mucosa layer. 
 Hyperplasia and distortion of crypt structure.
 Chronic inflammatory cell infiltration.
 No evidence of malignancy (unless as very rarely happens the two conditions occur together).

If the biopsy includes polypoid lesions, there are villiform structures visible. Gland entrapment in the submucosa is sometimes seen, which is termed colitis cystica profunda.

Management
Treatment of SRUS is difficult and there is a lack of evidence-based guidelines for treatment of SRUS. The treatment is based on the pathophysiology of SRUS, and the main aim is restoration of a normal pattern of defecation. The exact treatment depends on the severity of the symptoms, the severity/type of SRUS and whether rectal prolapse is present or absent.

Conservative measures are the first line treatment for patients with no symptoms, or only mild to moderate symptoms, and who have no significant anatomical defect. Conservative measures by themselves may improve symptoms and prevent the condition getting worse. Where conservative measures fail, or with severe disease and symptoms, or with significant anatomical defects, surgical options may be indicated. Improvement in symptoms does not always equate to healing of the ulcer as seen on endoscopy.

Conservative (non-surgical)
Conservative management is focussed on education of the patient and behaviour modification. Where indicated, conservative management may also involve treatment of psychological problems, and avoidance of anal-receptive sex (to prevent trauma to the rectum).

Modification of bowel habit
 Regular bathroom visits, for a limited period of time. 
 Avoidance of excessive straining. This can improve symptoms in up to 67% of cases and allow some degree of healing of the ulcer in about 30% of cases. 
 Use of a stool to elevate the legs during defecation, thereby straightening the anorectal angle and allowing for less effort during defecation. Alternatively, a squatting position can be used. 
 Avoidance of any kind of rectal manipulation (digitation, enemas, suppositories).

Dietary measures
 A high-fiber diet may help, but by itself is insufficient treatment. Improvement with high-fiber diet varies between 19% and 70%. 
 Bulk forming laxatives, e.g. psyllium powder.
 Stool softeners.
 Adequate intake of water (non-carbonated and caffeine-free drinks) during the day.

Biofeedback
Biofeedback targets pelvic floor behaviours and enables a reprogramming of autonomic nerologic pathways associated with defecation. The treatment is particularly helpful for dyssynergic defecation. Research studies have shown that there is improved blood flow to the rectal mucosa after biofeedback therapy. The overall rate of complete resolution of both symptoms and ulceration varies at 50-75%. Stool frequency and straining effort decrease after this treatment. In about 56% of cases biofeedback treatment stops rectal bleeding. Some patients are able to cease relying on digitation. Biofeedback is more effective in children with SRUS compared to adults.

Topical agents
Several different topical treatments (i.e. substances applied directly to the ulcer) have been reported, with variable outcomes. They are usually administered by enema and may be helpful for short term management of acute symptoms in SRUS. They are thought to work by reducing inflammation and physically forming a barrier over the surface of the ulcer to protect it from irritants and allowing it to heal. However the long term efficacy is unknown. According to a systematic review, 57% of SRUS patients receiving medical treatment had resolution of ulceration. Topical agents which have been used for SRUS include:

 Glucocorticoid steroids.
 Sucralfate. 
 Salicylates.
 Sulfasalazine.
 Mesalamine (5-aminosalicylic acid).

Surgery
Surgery may be indicated for severe cases of SRUS (either severe symptoms, severe ulceration, or significant associated anatomical defect such as prolapse), or when conservative measures fail. Some authors state that most patients do not benefit from surgery. Overall, up to 33% of SRUS patients end up requiring surgery. A systematic review reported that SRUS improved in 77% of patients who underwent any type of surgery, however 52% of cases developed a later recurrence of the condition. It has been suggested that any treatment which only addresses the ulcer without correcting the underlying causes will typically lead to recurrence.

There are multiple different surgical procedures which have been reported for SRUS, including:
 Local excision (removing the area of ulceration).
 Local therapies (usually injection of different agents into the rectal wall). 
 Delorme procedure.
 Perineal proctectomy (Altemeier procedure).
 Rectopexy.
 Stapled transanal local excision (STARR) (has been used for SRUS with internal prolapse).
 Diversion colostomy.
 Transanal mucosal sleeve resection along with coloanal pull-through.

Local therapies
Various local treatments for SRUS have been reported. According to one report, such measures have generally unfavorable results, and sometimes the ulcer returns deeper and larger than before the treatment.

 Injection of steroid 100 mg diluted in 10 ml water into the rectal wall around the ulcer. 
 Argon plasma coagulation (APC). This procedure uses high frequency monopolar current directed by ionised argon gas to coagulate tissues and mucosal ulcers, aiming to promote healing through re-epithelializion.
 Sclerotherapy: injection into the submucosal layer or retro rectal space with 5% phenol, 30% hypertonic saline or 25% glucose and perianal cerclage. 
 Human fibrin glue sealant applied endoscopically.  
 Injection of botulinum toxin injection into the external anal sphincter.

Local excision
Excision (removal) of the ulcer and suturing the resulting defect with surrounding healthy mucosa has been reported. However, the may not be any long-term benefit. Ulcers in the upper part of the rectum may be accessible to local excision using a transanal minimally invasive approach (TAMIS). Excision with neodymium yttrium-aluminiumgarnet laser has also been reported.

Rectopexy
Rectopexy is a surgery for rectal prolapse. A newer version of the procedure is termed ventral mesh rectopexy, which has also been used for SRUS. It may be performed with or without anterior resection (removal of a portion of the front wall of the rectum). It may be used with or without mesh to reinforce the anterior rectal wall. It can be done as an open procedure or with a laparoscopic abdominal approach. Some authors state rectopexy is suitable in highly select cases, while others say it is the procedure of choice, since it directly addresses the most likely cause. There is also more evidence to support the use of rectopexy in SRUS compared to other surgical procedures. Approximately 55-83% of patients with SRUS get reduced symptoms after rectopexy, and these benefits appear to be long term.

Other options
The following "last resort" surgical procedures (which may have significant consequences) have been reported in severe, persistent or recurrent cases of SRUS:

 Lower anterior resection with coloanal anastomosis/reconstruction.
 Fecal diversion (can be a temporary measure).

Epidemiology
The condition is relatively rare, but the exact prevalence is not known. Prevalence has been estimated as 1 in 100,000 people per year. SRUS can occur at any age, but it is most common in adults aged between 30-50. Males and females are affected almost equally. or slightly more in females.

Misdiagnosis as inflammatory bowel disease (IBD) or rectal polyps may hide the true prevalence of SRUS.

References

External links 

Colorectal surgery
Rectum